Central City Skatepark is a free public skatepark located in downtown Macon, Georgia. The skatepark has a street section which opened in 2017 and a concrete bowl section which opened in 2019.

References 

Skateparks in the United States